Sabrina Vega Gutiérrez (born 28 February 1987 in Las Palmas) is a Spanish chess player who holds the FIDE titles of International Master (IM) and Woman Grandmaster (WGM).

Chess career

From 1996 to 2007, Vega participated in European Youth Chess Championships and World Youth Chess Championships in different age categories. She fulfilled a Women's Grandmaster norm in Mondariz (2005/06), Lorce (2007) and La Massana (2007). Vega twice in a row won Belgrad chess tournaments (2013, 2014).

Vega has played for Spain in seven Chess Olympiads (2004, 2008–2016). Vega has played for Spain in six European Team Chess Championships (2005-2015).

She was Spanish Women's Champion in 2008, 2012 and 2015. In 2016, in Mamaia, Vega won silver medal in European Individual Women Chess Championship.

Her elder sister, Belinda Vega Gutierrez, started playing chess some years after her, and is a Woman International Master.

References

External links

Sabrina Vega Gutiérrez chess games at 365Chess.com

1987 births
Chess International Masters
Chess woman grandmasters
Spanish female chess players
Sportspeople from Las Palmas
Chess Olympiad competitors
Living people